Royal Crescent Mob was an American four-piece punk funk/funk rock band from Columbus, Ohio, United States, formed in 1985. Also known to their fans as the R.C. Mob, the band members included Brian "B" Emch (guitar), David Ellison (vocals, harmonica), Harold "Happy" Chichester (bass, vocals) and after an early revolving door of drummers, Carlton Smith (drums). 

After garnering considerable college radio airplay in the 1980s, the band was signed to Sire Records, a Warner Bros. Records subsidiary. In the late 1980s and early 1990s, the band gained national exposure opening for national touring artists the Replacements, the B-52's, and the Red Hot Chili Peppers among others. Despite regularly performing to packed houses, the band's two releases on Sire failed to perform in sales and on the charts, causing Sire to drop them from the label. After self-releasing a live album, followed by the more experimental full-length studio album Good Lucky Killer, the group disbanded.

Post-breakup, Smith recorded several tracks with 24-7 Spyz for their 1996 Heavy Metal Soul By The Pound album. Chichester went on to form Howlin' Maggie, worked with the Afghan Whigs, was a founding member of The Twilight Singers and is currently pursuing a solo career. Ellison has gone on to tour managing such artists as Alanis Morissette, Indigo Girls, Goo Goo Dolls, Avril Lavigne, and Panic! at the Disco.

Discography

Albums
Land of Sugar EP (No Other) 1986
Omerta (Moving Target/Celluloid) 1987
Something New, Old and Borrowed (Moving Target/Celluloid) 1988
Spin the World (Sire) 1989
Midnight Rose's (Sire/Warner Bros.) 1991
13 Destruction (Mobco) 1992
Good Lucky Killer (Enemy) 1994

Singles

References

External links 
The Royal Crescent Mob Fansite

Punk rock groups from Ohio
Funk rock musical groups
Musical groups from Columbus, Ohio
Sire Records artists
Enemy Records artists

2022 -Reforming for 2 shows Dec 16th Columbus OH- Dec 17th Covington, KY